This is a list of members of the Australian Senate from 1990 to 1993. Half of the state senators had been allocated a long term following the double dissolution election in 1987 and had terms due to finish on 30 June 1993; the other half of the state senators were elected at the March 1990 election and had terms due to finish on 30 June 1996. The territory senators were elected at the March 1990 election and their terms ended at the next federal election, which was March 1993.

The composition of the Senate was affected by the decision in 1987 as to which senators received a long term, with Labor and the Democrats voting to reject the alternate "recount" method that had been unanimously recommended by the Joint Select Committee on Electoral Reform in 1983, and facilitated by the Commonwealth Electoral Act. Thus the Labor government, with only 32 seats, needed 7 additional votes to achieve the majority necessary to pass legislation. Because the Democrats had got 2 additional long vacancies in 1987, in South Australia and New South Wales, the Democrats had a total of 8 seats from 1990 and thus continued to hold the balance of power, even after Janet Powell resigned from the Democrats in 1992.

Notes

References

Members of Australian parliaments by term
20th-century Australian politicians
Australian Senate lists